Platycarpha is a genus of South African plants dandelion subfamily within the daisy family.

Recent studies have suggested splitting Platycarpha into two genera, Platycarpha and Platycarphella. Further work remains to be done to resolve this.

The name Platycarpha is derived from two Greek words, platys "broad" and karphos "a chip of straw or wood, a scale, a dry stalk". The name was first used by Christian Friedrich Lessing in 1831. The type species is Platycarpha glomerata. This species had been named Cynara glomerata by Carl Peter Thunberg in 1800, and was moved to Platycarpha by A.P. de Candolle in 1836 in Prodromus Systematis Naturalis Regni Vegetabilis.

The systematic position of Platycarpha has long been regarded with uncertainty. Most authors have placed it in the tribe Arctotideae until molecular phylogenetic studies showed it to be closer to Vernonieae. In 2009, the new tribe Platycarpheae was established for Platycarpha and Platycarphella.

 Species
 Platycarpha carlinoides Oliv. & Hiern- South Africa
 Platycarpha glomerata (Thunb.) Less. - South Africa
 Platycarpha parvifolia S.Moore - South Africa

References

External links 
 Platycarpha At:Plants of southern Africa At: PlantZAfrica.com
 CRC World Dictionary of Plant Names: M-Q At: Google Books
 Platycarpha In: Linnaea volume 6
 Platycarpha At:Index Nominum Genericorum At: References At: NMNH Department of Botany At: Research and Collections At: Smithsonian National Museum of Natural History
 Cynara In: Prodromus Plantarum Capensium volume 2
 Platycarpha In: Prodr. (DC.) volume 5

Asteraceae genera
Endemic flora of South Africa
Vernonioideae